Megam is one of the Garo dialects in Garo Hills and And in Khasi Hills which is a part of Sino-Tibetan language spoken in Mynensingh and in Kalmakanda subdistrict, Netrokona district, Mymensingh division, Bangladesh. It is a sub-language of Garo and it is closely related to Garo, but has been strongly influenced by Khasian languages, to the extent that it is only 7–9% lexically similar to with A’being, the neighboring Garo dialect, but 60% similar to the Khasian language Lyngngam.

Garo Language has Many Dialects and among them is Me.gam dialect. Some Me.gam People identify also as a Clan and Use Me.gam name as a Surname. Me.gam clan identity their surnames as Me.gam Sangma or Megam Momin which differs from region to region.

References

Garo Language has Many Dialects  and among them is Me.gam dialect. Some Me.gam People identify also as a Clan and Use Me.gam name as a Surname. Me.gam clan identity their surnames as Me.gam Sangma or Megam Momin which differs from region to region.

Sal languages
Languages of Bangladesh